Korvald's Cabinet governed Norway between 18 October 1972 and 16 October 1973. The centre cabinet was led by Lars Korvald as Prime Minister and consisted of the Christian Democratic Party, the Centre Party and the Liberal Party.

Cabinet members

|}

State Secretaries

References
Lars Korvald's Government. 18 October 1972 - 16 October 1973 - Government.no

Notes

Korvald
Korvald
Korvald
Korvald
1972 establishments in Norway
1973 disestablishments in Norway
Cabinets established in 1972
Cabinets disestablished in 1973